Senator Bullen may refer to:

Charles Bullen (Utah politician) (1919–2009), Utah State Senate
Herschel Bullen (1870–1966), Utah State Senate
Reed Bullen (1906–2005), Utah State Senate